The Zurbrugg Mansion, which has also been known as The Columns, at 531 Delaware Avenue in Delanco Township, Burlington County, New Jersey, was built in 1910.  It was designed by architects Furness, Evans & Co. in Classical Revival style.  Vacant for several years after being used as a nursing home, it was acquired by Grapevine Development and subsequently listed on the National Register of Historic Places on August 28, 2009, for its significance in architecture.  The listing included two contributing buildings, a contributing structure, and a contributing object.

History
In 2010 the main building was renovated and re-opened as a 27-unit Independent Senior Residence.

The vacant Carriage House was also renovated into a single family residence and sold to a private owner. The surrounding property has been subdivided and developed into RiverWalk on the Delaware, a luxury townhouse community.

It was the home of Swiss-born Theophilus Zurbrugg (1861–1912) and his family. A watchmaker, he founded The Keystone Watch Case Co.

References

Houses on the National Register of Historic Places in New Jersey
Neoclassical architecture in New Jersey
Houses completed in 1910
Houses in Burlington County, New Jersey
Swiss-American history
National Register of Historic Places in Burlington County, New Jersey
New Jersey Register of Historic Places
Delanco Township, New Jersey